Melissa Helmbrecht ( 1975 in Wilmington, Delaware) is a New Jersey based, social entrepreneur, and advocate for young people. Over the course of her career, she has worked with children and families who struggle with adversity by helping them get the tools and resources they need to improve their lives. Through non-profit work, she actively addresses three social problems including reforming the foster care system, making college affordable for low income youth, and engaging young people in volunteer service and civic life.

Biography 
During her academic pursuits, Helmbrecht was confronted with a variety of challenges, failing in her freshman year at Arthur P. Schalick High School before moving to Florida, where learning about the challenges of homelessness led her to refocus her efforts on her education.

Helmbrecht was appointed the youngest member of the Orlando, Florida Leadership Council in 1991. In this position she promoted youth service around the city. She also participated in a design council for the Disney model town of Celebration, Florida.

In 1991, President George H.W. Bush designated Orlando as “America’s First City of Light,” a pilot project of the Points of Light Foundation to increase volunteerism in America. She was appointed to the business leadership council, youth leadership council, and the executive board of the City of Light. In this role, Helmbrecht won support to launch a program called Schools of Light to integrate volunteer service into all area schools. While a senior in High School, Melissa created a national organization called Youth CAN under the auspices of the Caring Institute to inspire youth across America to volunteer and to encourage nonprofit organizations to view youth as resources and elevate youth into decision-making roles.

Helmbrecht graduated from American University in Washington, D.C. in 1998, and the University of Denver College of Law in 2001 where she studied child advocacy law. While at the University of Denver Law School, Helmbrecht served as the 15th Circuit Governor for the American Bar Association Law Student Division and on the ABA Committee for the Unmet Legal Needs of Children. In 2000 Helmbrecht was a speaker at the National Association of Independent Schools conference. She studied at the Rocky Mountain Children's Law Center, serving as a Guardian Ad Litem for abused and neglected children in court. As the president of the Children's Millennium Movement, Helmbrecht was cited by the American Bar Association in 2001 for her work addressing the needs of foster children.

In the wake of the Columbine High School Massacre and the September 11th terrorist attacks, Helmbrecht set out to help young people, who felt powerless in a increasingly tumultuous world, restore their sense of agency and potential for impact through service. Helmbrecht founded an organization called the Youth Investment Project with a grant from Youth Service America, and was acknowledged by that organization as one of the "six most promising social entrepreneurs in America." The project was an intensive mentoring program for middle school students in Denver, Colorado to encourage their participation in peer mediation and conflict resolution activities. The youth involvement project included a "Day of Hope" on the first anniversary of the Columbine High School massacre that featured two surviving students.  On the Day of Hope, 10,000 young people participated in volunteer service projects 

In 2000, Helmbrecht founded Champions of Hope, a global team of youth dedicated to tackling personal and social challenges through service. That organization, along with Youth Service America, founded the United Day of Service, which was designed to promote youth-led service learning projects across the country. The United Day of Service was participated in by over three million volunteers from the U.S. and 150 other countries. Approximately 650,000 youth registered to organize and participate in service projects. Activities were sponsored by the Verizon Foundation. Helmbrecht was responsible for securing the participation of Kelly Clarkson in the first celebration of the United Day of Service on September 11, 2002 at the National Mall, along with actor Sean Astin and former U.S. Senator Harris Wofford. That year she served on the White House's "Youth Service Compact," a committee of the top non-profit groups in the country that convened at the White House to design a strategy to increase the impact of youth service organizations.

In 2008, Helmbrecht served on the Global Ambassadors committee of Airline Ambassadors International, a project organized by travel commentator Peter Greenberg, the travel editor of NBC's Today Show. She also signed the Youth Entitlements Summit Declaration in June, 2008.

In 2007, Helmbrecht founded Splashlife, Inc., an online company for America’s youth. It empowered youth through community and advocacy support, networking and other tools for daily life management. On March 19, 2009, Whoopi Goldberg mentioned Splashlife on The View. Through Splashlife, Helmbrecht organized large-scale, youth-led mobilizations focused on social transformation. The first campaign is called 'Hunger and Homelessness in America' was based on Helmbrecht's personal experience volunteering at a homeless shelter as a youth. Partnering with Peter Samuelson's EDAR (Everyone Deserves a Roof), Splashlife is sharing the organization as a "brilliant example of one way to design simple temporary solutions for complex issues." In 2011, the company partnered with Team Rubicon to launch a national ‘Rebuilding from Devastation’ campaign to support disaster relief efforts in the Southern and Midwest regions of the U.S. It also launched Generation Innovation, an initiative designed to support and reward the nation’s young entrepreneurs, as a part of the White House Youth Entrepreneur Summit.

Helmbrecht is the Founder and CEO of Hopeloft , a non-profit charity in based in New Jersey.  According to its website, Hopeloft provides "community services such as one-on-one family advocacy and support, trauma-informed work and education opportunities, life skill classes, etc."

Political career 
Helmbrecht ran for U.S. House of Representatives in Virginia's Eighth Congressional District in 2003. She ran as a Republican and was one of the youngest women to ever run for Congress. Lisa Marie Cheney secured the nomination at the district Republican convention.

Awards and recognition 
Helmbrecht has been the recipient of several awards, including the White House Building Healthy Communities and Healthy Youth Award, the CBS Everyday Hero Award, the Walt Disney World Dreamers and Doers Award, and the National Caring Award. She was also inducted into the Frederick Douglass Museum and Hall of Fame for Caring Americans and was named "One of the Six Leading Social Entrepreneurs in America" by Youth Service America.

Personal life
Helmbrecht was raised in southern New Jersey and moved to Orlando, Florida.  She resided there until the age of 15 when her parents divorced. After her encounter with homeless girl at the Orlando Union Rescue Mission for Battered Women and Children, Helmbrecht focused on studies and campaigned around the city to raise awareness for homeless children, soliciting donations and recruiting volunteers, especially youth.

References

External links 
 Hopeloft.com
 Giveback.ngo

1970s births
Living people
American University alumni
Arthur P. Schalick High School alumni
Candidates in the 2004 United States elections
People from Bridgeton, New Jersey
People from Wilmington, Delaware
Sturm College of Law alumni
Youth empowerment people